Kauhajoki Karhu Basket,  is a Finnish basketball team from Kauhajoki. The team plays in Korisliiga, the highest tier of Finnish basketball.

In 2018, the club achieved their first Korisliiga title ever after defeating Salon Vilpas 4–2 in the finals. It successfully defended its title the next season to repeat as Finnish champions.

Honours
Korisliiga
Winners (3): 2017–18, 2018–19, 2021-22

European record

Players

Current roster

Notable players

Individual awards

Korisliiga Finals MVP
Bojan Šarčević – 2018
Cameron Jones – 2019, 2022

Korisliiga Defensive Player of the Year
Vesa Mäkäläinen – 2011
Henri Hirvikoski – 2013

External links 
 

Basketball teams in Finland
Karhu
2017 establishments in Finland